The Estonian Ice Hockey Association is the national governing body of ice hockey in Estonia. Estonian membership in the International Ice Hockey Federation dated back to the 1930s, which had expired after the annexation of these countries by the Soviet Union in 1940 and 1945 respectively, was renewed after their sovereignty was re-established in the 1990s.

Professional teams 
HC Viking
HC Tallinn
Narva PSK
Noortekoondis

Amateur teams
Amateur teams in Estonia are part of the "Independent Ice Hockey League" (HHL).

See also
 Estonia men's national ice hockey team
 Estonia men's national junior ice hockey team

References

External links
 Official website

Ice hockey in Estonia
Ice hockey governing bodies in Europe
International Ice Hockey Federation members
Ice hockey
1930s establishments in Estonia
Sports organizations established in the 1930s